Mona Barthel was the defending champion, but lost in the first round to Antonia Lottner.

Petra Kvitová won the title, defeating Mihaela Buzărnescu in the final, 4–6, 6–2, 6–3.

Seeds

Draw

Finals

Top half

Bottom half

Qualifying

Seeds

Qualifiers

Lucky losers

Draw

First qualifier

Second qualifier

Third qualifier

Fourth qualifier

External links 
 Main craw
 Qualifying craw

Singles